Trigger (Stylized as ∠TRIGGER) is the eighth studio album by the Japanese pop-rock band Porno Graffitti. It was released on March 24, 2010 and was ranked first in the Oricon chart during 2010.

Track listing

References

2010 albums
Porno Graffitti albums
Japanese-language albums
Sony Music albums